Trounson is a surname. Notable people with the surname include:

 Alan Trounson (born 1946), Australian biologist, pioneer of in vitro fertilisation;  Emeritus Professor, Monash University and President of the California Institute for Regenerative Medicine
 Donald Trounson (1905-2009), British diplomat and Australian bird photographer